Cossaei were a warlike tribe inhabiting a mountainous district called Cossaea (Κοσσαία), likely related to the Kassites, on the borders of Susiana to the south, and of Media Magna to the north. They were a hill tribe, and were armed with bows and arrows. Their land was sterile and unproductive, and they lived the life of robbers. Strabo speaks of them as constantly at war with their neighbours, and testifies to their power when he says that they sent 13,000 men to assist the Elymaei in a war against the people of Babylonia and Susiana. Alexander led his forces against them and subdued them, at least for a time. The Persian kings had never been able to reduce them, but had been in the habit of paying them a tribute, when they moved their court annually from Ecbatana to Babylon, to pass their winter at the latter place. In character, they seem to have resembled the Bakhtiari tribes, who now roam over the same mountains which they formerly occupied. 

There is some variety in the orthography of their name in ancient authors. Pliny calls them Cussii, and in some places they are apparently confounded with the Cissii. It is possible that their name may be connected with the modern Khuzistan.

References

Ancient peoples of Asia
Opponents of Alexander the Great